Khoo Kay Kim (28 March 1937 – 28 May 2019) was a Malaysian historian and academic of Chinese descent. He was honoured with Emeritus Professor title by the University of Malaya in 2001. In January 2011, Khoo was appointed Chancellor of KDU University College.

Prime Minister Mahathir Mohamad described Khoo’s passing as a truly great loss to the country.

Biography 
Khoo Kay Kim was born to Peranakan Chinese parents in Kampar, Perak, Malaysia on 28 March 1937. During his early education, he attend the English school in the morning before the Chinese school later in the afternoon. He received a BA, MA, and a PhD in 1959, 1967, and 1974 respectively from the University of Malaya. His doctoral thesis was entitled The Beginnings of Political Extremism in Malaya 1915-1935 (1974), where he was supervised by Kennedy G. Tregonning, the Raffles Professor of History at the University of Malaya. Khoo was one of the co-authors of Rukunegara. He was a highly regarded national academic for his views on local sports and socio-political issues.

Personal life 
He had married with N. Sri Rathimalar The couple has three sons; traditional arts and culture advocate Eddin Khoo, Rubin Khoo and dancer Mavin Khoo.

Death 
Khoo died of lung failure on 28 May 2019, Tuesday morning at the University Malaya Medical Centre (UMMC), Petaling Jaya, Selangor at the age of 82.

Honours

Honours of Malaysia 
  :
  Companion of the Order of Loyalty to the Crown of Malaysia (JSM) – (1983)
  Commander of the Order of Loyalty to the Crown of Malaysia (PSM) – Tan Sri  (2008)
  :
  Knight Commander of the Order of the Perak State Crown (DPMP) – Dato' (1987)
  :
  Knight Commander of the Order of the Crown of Selangor (DPMS) – Dato' (2009)

Awards and accolades 
 :
 The 10th "Tokoh Akademik Negara" of the National Academic Awards or Anugerah Akademik Negara (AAN) (2017)
 Merdeka Award for Outstanding Scholastic Achievement (2018)

Places named after him 
In July 2019, the Selangor state government with the consent of the Sultan of Selangor, Sultan Sharafuddin Idris Shah decreed to renamed Jalan Semangat in Petaling Jaya as Jalan Prof. Khoo Kay Kim in honouring the Khoo's contributions during his life.

Selected bibliography 

 The Western Malay States 1850-1873: The Effects of Commercial Development on Malay Politics (1972) 
 Teluk Anson (Teluk Intan) 100 Tahun (1982)
 Malay Society: Transformation & Democratisation: A Stimulating and Discerning Study on the Evolution of Malay Society Through the Passage of Time (1991) 
 His Majesty Sultan Azlan Shah (1991) 
 Taiping: Ibukota Perak (1981)
 Taiping: The Vibrant Years (2003) 
 100 Years the University of Malaya (2005) 
 I, KKK: The Autobiography of a Historian (2017)

References

External links 
 History of Malaysia. Malaysian National Library. URL accessed on 10 April 2006.

1937 births
2019 deaths
People from Perak
Malaysian people of Hokkien descent
Malaysian people of Chinese descent
Peranakan people in Malaysia
20th-century Malaysian historians
Malaysian male writers
Historians of Southeast Asia
Academic staff of the University of Malaya
University of Malaya alumni
Commanders of the Order of Loyalty to the Crown of Malaysia
21st-century Malaysian historians
20th-century male writers